Ivaylo Banchev (born 26 June 1971) is a Bulgarian rower. He competed in two events at the 1992 Summer Olympics.

References

External links
 

1971 births
Living people
Bulgarian male rowers
Olympic rowers of Bulgaria
Rowers at the 1992 Summer Olympics
Sportspeople from Ruse, Bulgaria